Inside Dave Van Ronk is a 1964 album by American folksinger Dave Van Ronk.

Inside Dave Van Ronk was recorded in April 1962 during the same sessions that produced Dave Van Ronk, Folksinger and that all ended up on the Fantasy Records 1989 CD release Inside Dave Van Ronk.

Track listing
"House Carpenter" (Traditional) – 3:30
"The Cruel Ship's Captain" (Traditional) – 1:55
"Sprig of Thyme" (Traditional) – 2:35
"Talking Cancer Blues" (Rhodes) – 1:45
"I Buyed Me a Little Dog" (Traditional) – 3:59
"Lady Gay" (Traditional) – 3:40
"Fair and Tender Ladies" (Traditional) – 5:40
"Brian O'Lynne" (Traditional) – 1:15
"Shanty Man's Life" (Traditional) – 3:20
"Silver Dagger" (Traditional) – 2:20
"Kentucky Moonshiner" (Traditional) – 2:35
"He Never Came Back" (Traditional) – 2:10

Personnel
Dave Van Ronk – vocals, 6 and 12-string guitar, dulcimer, banjo, autoharp, harmonica
Samuel Charters – producer
Don Schlitten – cover photograph

See also
Inside Llewyn Davis, 2013 film based on Van Ronk's career

References

1964 albums
Dave Van Ronk albums
albums produced by Samuel Charters
Prestige Records albums